Jörg Siebert (born 2 April 1944) is a competition rower and Olympic champion for West Germany.

Siebert won a gold medal in eight at the 1968 Summer Olympics in Mexico City, as a member of the rowing team from West Germany.

References

1944 births
Living people
Olympic gold medalists for West Germany
Olympic rowers of West Germany
Rowers at the 1968 Summer Olympics
Olympic medalists in rowing
West German male rowers
Medalists at the 1968 Summer Olympics
European Rowing Championships medalists